"STAR21" was the name given to the  9-car experimental Shinkansen train developed in 1992 by the East Japan Railway Company (JR East) in Japan to test technology to be incorporated in next-generation shinkansen trains operating at speeds of  or higher. The name was an acronym for "Superior Train for the Advanced Railway toward the 21st Century".

Design
The train consisted of nine cars arranged in two distinct "halves", with the Class 952 half-set consisting of four separate vehicles, and the Class 953 half-set consisting of five articulated vehicles using shared bogies.

Three different construction methods were used for the vehicle bodies. Cars 1 to 3 used welded hollow aluminium extrusions, cars 4 to 5 used brazed aluminium honeycomb panels, and cars 6 to 9 used an aircraft-style Duralumin fuselage construction.

The front-end design of the two driving vehicles (952-1 and 953-5) were slightly different, although both used a wedge-shaped profile with little lateral taper.

The external livery was light green for the Class 952 cars (including half of car 953-1), "snow" grey for cars 953-1 to 953-3, and beige for cars 953-3 to 953-5, with a light blue window band throughout the length of the train.

Internally, cars were fitted with passengers seats, arranged 2+2 abreast for standard class cars, and 2+1 abreast for the Green car (952-4). Five different types of lightweight seating design were tested.

Formation
The set, designated S5, was initially formed as follows with some cars unpowered.

Cars 1 to 3 were built by Nippon Sharyo, cars 4 to 5 were built by Hitachi, and cars 6 to 8 were built by Kawasaki Heavy Industries.

Cars 3 and 7 were fitted with pantographs.

History

The train was delivered in March 1992, and unveiled to the press on 2 April.

This record stood until it was broken by JR Central's "300X" experimental train in July 1996.

The STAR21 trainset was officially withdrawn on 17 February 1998.

Preservation
End car 952-1 is preserved outdoors at the RTRI large-scale wind tunnel test facility in Maibara, Shiga, first displayed to the public on 10 October 1998. Cars 953-1 and 953-5 are preserved at Sendai Shinkansen Depot. A DT9035B bogie from the train was donated in June 1998 by Sumitomo Metal Industries to the Nara National College of Technology in Nara, where it is kept on display.

References

Further reading

 

Articulated passenger trains
Jōetsu Shinkansen
Experimental and prototype high-speed trains
Hitachi multiple units
Land speed record rail vehicles
Tilting trains
Shinkansen train series
Tōhoku Shinkansen
Kawasaki multiple units
Train-related introductions in 1992
Nippon Sharyo multiple units
25 kV AC multiple units